PBR may refer to:

Science and technology
 Passive bistatic radar
 Partition boot record
 Pebble bed reactor, a type of nuclear reactor
 Peripheral benzodiazepine receptor, another name for translocator protein
 Phosphorus bromide
 Photobioreactor
 Policy-based routing
 Pusey-Barrett-Rudolph theorem about the reality of quantum states
 Physically based rendering, a method used in computer graphics
 Precariously balanced rock, another name for a balancing rock

Commerce
 Petrobras, Brazilian oil company, NYSE code
 Payment by Results
 Pre-Budget Report, one of the two economic forecasts that HM Treasury is required to deliver to the UK Parliament each year

Military
 Patrol Boat, River, a US Navy designation
 Plastic baton round, a type of non-lethal projectile

Transport
 Potters Bar railway station, Hertfordshire, England, National Rail station code
 Puffing Billy Railway, tourist railway in Melbourne, Australia

Other
 Pabst Blue Ribbon, an American beer brand
 Parti Burkinabè pour la Refondation
 Pelita Bandung Raya, a football club based in Bandung, Indonesia
 Performance-based regulation of utilities
 Plant breeders' rights over new varieties
 Professional Bull Riders, an international professional bull riding organization